Jharsuguda Power Station is a coal-based thermal power plant located at Burkhamunda near Jharsuguda town in Jharsuguda district in the Indian state of Odisha. The power plant is operated by the Sterlite Energy.

The coal for the plant is sourced from Ib Valley Coalfield. Water is sourced from reservoir of Hirakud Dam. The Engineering, procurement and construction contract is given to SEPCO3 of People's Republic of China.

Capacity
It is a 2400 MW (4×600 MW) project.

References

External links

 Sterlite power station at SourceWatch

Coal-fired power stations in Odisha
Jharsuguda district
Vedanta Resources
2010 establishments in Orissa
Energy infrastructure completed in 2010